Brenner is an American crime drama of the 1950s and 1960s. The series was filmed in New York City focusing on Lieutenant Roy Brenner, a 20-year veteran of the Internal Affairs Department of the NYPD, and his son Ernie, a rookie detective, who travel around the city solving various crimes. The series starred Edward Binns and James Broderick as Lt. Roy Brenner and Det. Ernie Brenner, respectively. Brenner, a perennial summer replacement series, aired new episodes on CBS from June 6, 1959–September 19, 1959 and again from May 17–July 19, 1964. Reruns plus two previously unaired episodes were seen during the summer of 1961, an additional summer of reruns in 1962 and a final set of new and repeat broadcasts from July 26–September 13, 1964.

Premise

The show was centered around the careers of the Brenners, Roy and his son Ernie. Roy (Edward Binns) is a street hardened lieutenant of the Internal Affairs Department of the NYPD. He has been a part of the NYPD for twenty years. His son Ernie (James Broderick) is an idealistic rookie detective also working for the NYPD. Together, the two face, fight and solve crime, as well as face police corruption and all its ugliness, and try to learn from their different views of life, death, and work.

It was somewhat of a challenge for the two to portray a convincing father-and-son duo with Binns only 11 years older than Broderick.

Synopsis

Development

The series was created by producer Herbert Brodkin, who had already made himself a household name with producing credits on The Philco Television Playhouse, Goodyear Television Playhouse and The Alcoa Hour for NBC, and Studio One and Playhouse 90 for CBS. Brodkin later produced several other well-well-known television series including The Defenders and The Nurses.

Brenner was a transitional project for Brodkin. It was his first independent production, his first series to be shot on film, and (aside from his first producing assignment, CBS's live Charlie Wild, Private Detective) his initial concession to the reality that programs with running characters were quickly supplanting the anthology drama. Like The Defenders and The Nurses, Brenner was based on a one-shot anthology show from Brodkin's catalog, a January 15, 1959 telecast of Playhouse 90 entitled "The Blue Men". Intriguingly, Alvin Boretz, who wrote The Blue Men, is not credited as the creator of Brenner, although he did contribute scripts to the series.

Season 1 (1959-1961)

Brenner premiered on Saturday June 6, 1959 on the CBS Television Network. Ratings were poor from the beginning and after fourteen episodes aired, on September 19, 1959, Brenner was cancelled. Two new episodes produced in 1960 aired in June and September 1961.

Season 2 (1964)

Sixteen episodes of Brenner aired on CBS between June 6, 1959 and September 11, 1961. Ten addition episodes that were produced between 1959 and 1960 had never aired on television. With reruns airing during the summers of 1961 and 1962, CBS decided that during the summer of 1964, they would air the remaining episodes five years after the initial cancellation and three years after new episodes of the series had last aired. The last of those ten episodes aired on Sunday July 19, 1964 with reruns airing until September 13.

Cast

Lieutenant Roy Brenner - portrayed by Edward Binns. Lt. Brenner, commonly referred to as just Brenner, is the police lieutenant of the Confidential Squad. Lt. Brenner is a street hardened veteran, as he has been working for the NYPD for twenty years.
Patrolman Ernie Brenner - portrayed by James Broderick. Ernie Brenner, commonly referred to as Officer Brenner, is an idealistic rookie plainclothesman for the NYPD. He, along with his father Roy, travel around New York City solving crimes.*
Detective Steve Mason - portrayed by Dick O'Neill
Inspector Spaud - portrayed by Walter Greaza
Detective Al Dunn - portrayed by Sydney Pollack
Detective Tom Cleary - portrayed by Crahan Denton
Officer Richard Clayburn - portrayed by Gene Hackman°

Episodes

Season 1 (1959–61)

Season 2 (1964)

Broadcast history

NOTE: The most frequent time slot for the series is in bold text.

 Saturday at 9:00-9:30 pm on CBS: June 6 -September 19, 1959
 Monday at 9:00-9:30 pm on CBS: June 19 -September 11, 1961
 Sunday at 9:00-9:30 pm on CBS: May 17 - July 19, 1964

References

External links
 
 Brenner at the Classic Television Archive, with a list of episodes

1959 American television series debuts
1964 American television series endings
Black-and-white American television shows
CBS original programming
English-language television shows
Fictional portrayals of the New York City Police Department
Films scored by Laurence Rosenthal
Television shows filmed in New York (state)
Television shows set in New York City